Tsai Ing-wen (born 31 August 1956) is a Taiwanese politician who has served as the president of the Republic of China (Taiwan) since 2016. A member of the Democratic Progressive Party (DPP), Tsai is the first female president of Taiwan. She served as chair of the DPP from 2020 to 2022, and also previously from 2008 to 2012 and 2014 to 2018.

Tsai grew up in Taipei and studied law and international trade, and later became a law professor at Soochow University School of Law and National Chengchi University after earning an LLB from National Taiwan University and an LLM from Cornell Law School. She later studied law at the London School of Economics and Political Science, with her thesis titled "Unfair trade practices and safeguard actions", and was awarded a Ph.D. in law from the University of London. In 1993, as an independent (without party affiliation), she was appointed to a series of governmental positions, including trade negotiator for WTO affairs, by the then ruling party Kuomintang (KMT) and was one of the chief drafters of the special state-to-state relations doctrine under the President Lee Teng-hui.

During the first term of Chen Shui-bian's presidency, Tsai served as Minister of the Mainland Affairs Council. She joined the DPP in 2004 and served briefly as a DPP-nominated at-large member of the Legislative Yuan, and was then appointed as Vice Premier under Premier Su Tseng-chang  until the cabinet's mass resignation in 2007. Following the DPP's defeat in the presidential election in 2008, she was elected as party chair of the DPP, but she resigned when the party lost the presidential election in 2012.

Tsai ran for New Taipei City mayorship in the 2010 municipal elections but was defeated by the KMT candidate, Eric Chu. In April 2011, Tsai became the first female nominated by a major party as a presidential candidate in the history of Taiwan after defeating her former superior, Su Tseng-chang, in the DPP's primary by a slight margin.  In the fifth presidential election in 2012, she was defeated by the then-president Ma Ying-jeou, but she won her first term of presidency in the 2016 presidential election by a landslide in a rematch against Chu. In the 2020 election, she was re-elected as president with an increased share of the vote. Tsai is the second president from the Democratic Progressive Party, and the first popularly elected president to have never served as Mayor of Taipei.

Tsai was named one of Time's most influential people of 2020 and was #9 on Forbes's most powerful women and #2 female politician after Kamala Harris of 2021. Internationally, Tsai has been praised for her response to the COVID-19 pandemic, and for standing up to pressure from the Government of the People's Republic of China. Tsai resigned as head of the Democratic People's Party (DPP) in November 2022, citing her party's poor performance in local elections earlier that month.

Early life and career
Tsai was born at Mackay Memorial Hospital in Zhongshan District, Taipei City on 31 August 1956, the youngest of nine (or eleven) children. Her father, Tsai Chieh-sheng (1918–2006), was a businessman who ran an auto repair shop, and her mother Chang Chin-fong (1925–2018) was a housewife. Her given name, Ing-wen (英文), was chosen by genealogical naming practices. While these suggested the spelling 瀛文, her father felt that the character 瀛 had too many strokes and decided to replace it with the character 英. During her high school period, she studied at Taipei Municipal Zhongshan Girls High School. She studied law at the behest of her father. After graduating at the College of Law, National Taiwan University, in 1978, Tsai obtained a Master of Laws at Cornell University Law School in 1980. She then studied law at the London School of Economics and was awarded a Ph.D. in law from the University of London in 1984. Upon her return to Taiwan, she taught law at the School of Law of Soochow University and National Chengchi University, both in Taipei.

In the 1990s, Tsai was also appointed to the Fair Trade Commission and the Copyright Commission. She served as consultant for the Mainland Affairs Council and the National Security Council. She also led the drafting team on the Statute Governing Relations with Hong Kong and Macau.

Rise in politics
In 2000, Tsai was given the high-profile appointment of chair of the Mainland Affairs Council. Confirming the widely held belief that she maintained Pan-Green sympathies, Tsai joined the Democratic Progressive Party (DPP) in 2004. She was subsequently nominated by the DPP to be a candidate in the 2004 legislative election and was elected as a legislator-at-large.

On 26 January 2006, Tsai was appointed to the post of vice president of the Executive Yuan, a position commonly referred to as vice premier. She concurrently served as chairwoman of the Consumer Protection Commission.

On 17 May 2007, Tsai, along with the rest of the cabinet of out-going Premier Su Tseng-chang, resigned to make way for incoming Premier Chang Chun-hsiung and his cabinet. Premier Chang named Chiou I-jen, the incumbent secretary-general of the Presidential Office to replace Tsai as vice premier. She then served as the chair of TaiMedBiologics, a biotechnology company based in Taiwan. The Kuomintang accused Tsai of contracting government work out to TaiMedBiologics during her term as vice premier, while planning to leave the government and lead the company afterward. She was later cleared of all alleged wrongdoing.

In Kuomintang candidate Ma Ying-jeou's search for his running mate for the 2008 ROC presidential election, Tsai, a DPP member, was surprisingly suggested. Ma stated that there were no set criteria for a running mate, that his search would not be defined by gender, occupation, or even political party affiliations.

On 19 May 2008, Tsai defeated Koo Kwang-ming in the election for DPP chair, and succeeded outgoing Frank Hsieh as the 12th-term chair of the party. She was the first woman to chair a major Taiwanese political party.

DPP chair

First term: 2008–2012

Tsai took office on 20 May 2008, the same day Ma Ying-jeou was inaugurated as president. She said that DPP would work to deepen the Taiwanese localization movement while defending social justice. She criticized Ma for mentioning closer Cross-Strait relations but nothing about Taiwan's sovereignty and national security.

Tsai questioned Ma's stance on Taiwan's sovereign status. Ma emphasized the importance of the so-called 1992 Consensus and called Tsai a Taiwan independence extremist. Tsai criticized Ma's government for not answering her question and labeling others.

After former President Chen Shui-bian's acknowledgment of transferring past campaign funds overseas, Tsai apologized to the public and also said that the DPP would not try to cover up for Chen's alleged misdeeds. The Clean Government Commission was set up to investigate corruption within the DPP.

On 25 April 2010, Tsai participated in a televised debate against President and Kuomintang chairman Ma Ying-jeou over a proposed trade agreement, the Economic Cooperation Framework Agreement (ECFA); while President Ma believed ECFA would increase Taiwanese exports to mainland China and lower unemployment rates, Tsai said it "will force Taiwan to open up for cheap Chinese exports eventually" and certain domestic industries will be harmed by the mainland trade invasion. Tsai also said that the pact "will make Taiwan lose its independence in cross-strait relations and become a Chinese parasite" and that Taiwan should negotiate with China under the multilateral-framework World Trade Organization, which would offer more trade protections and emphasize Taiwan's distinct status.

Under Tsai's leadership, along with some of KMT's unpopular policies, the DPP regained momentum in elections of 2009, after major defeats from 2006 to 2008. In 2010, she was re-elected as the chair of the DPP.

Tsai made a controversial statement in May 2010 claiming that the Republic of China was a "government-in-exile" non-native to Taiwan; however on 8 October 2011, two days prior to the 100-year anniversary celebrations of the Double Ten Day, Tsai changed her statement, stating that "The ROC is Taiwan, Taiwan is the ROC, and the current ROC government is no longer ruled by a non-native political power".

Tsai resigned as chair of the DPP after losing her 2012 presidential election bid to incumbent Ma Ying-jeou.

Second term: 2014–2018
On 15 March 2014, Tsai announced that she would once more run for party chief of the DPP against incumbent Su Tseng-chang and Frank Hsieh. However, both Su and Hsieh dropped out of the election in the aftermath of the Sunflower Student Movement. Tsai defeated Kaohsiung County deputy commissioner Kuo Tai-lin by 79,676 votes.

Tsai led the DPP to an historic victory in the local elections held on 29 November 2014, in which the party secured leadership of 13 of Taiwan's 22 municipalities and counties. The DPP's stunning victory in the elections strengthened Tsai's position within the party and placed her as the front-runner in the 2016 Presidential Elections; she announced her second bid for the Presidency on 15 February 2015. On 16 January 2016, she won the election by a landslide, winning 56.12% of votes, beating her opponent Eric Chu, who won 31.07% of the votes.

On 24 November 2018, she resigned as leader of the Democratic Progressive Party and refused Premier William Lai's resignation after a major defeat in local elections.

Third term: 2020–2022
Tsai resumed the Democratic Progressive Party leadership from Cho Jung-tai on 20 May 2020, when she was inaugurated for her second presidential term. She resigned as party leader following the 2022 Taiwanese local elections.

Presidential campaigns

2012

On 11 March 2011, Tsai Ing-wen officially announced her run for the presidential nomination of the Democratic Progressive Party. On 27 April 2011, Tsai became the first female presidential candidate in Taiwan after she defeated former Premier Su Tseng-chang by a small margin in a nationwide phone poll (of more than 15,000 samples) that served as the party's primary. Tsai ran against incumbent President Ma Ying-jeou of the Kuomintang and James Soong of the People First Party in the 5th direct presidential election, which was held on 14 January 2012. Garnering 45% of the vote, she conceded defeat to President Ma in an international press conference, resigning her seat as Chairman of the DPP.

2016

On 15 February 2015, Tsai officially registered for the Democratic Progressive Party's presidential nomination primary. Though William Lai and Su Tseng-chang were seen as likely opponents, Tsai was the only candidate to run in the primary and the DPP officially nominated her as the presidential candidate on 15 April.

During summer of 2015, Tsai embarked on a visit to the United States and met a number of US policy makers including Senators John McCain and Jack Reed. In her speech addressing Taiwanese diaspora on the east coast of the United States, Tsai signaled a willingness to cooperate with the rising Third Party coalition in Taiwan in the incoming general election. On 14 November, Tsai's campaign announced that she had chosen Chen Chien-jen as DPP vice presidential candidate. On 16 January 2016, Tsai won the presidential election, beating her opponent Eric Chu by a margin of 25.04%. Tsai was inaugurated as president on 20 May 2016.

After her election, Tsai was named one of "The 100 Most Influential People" in TIME magazine 2 May 2016 issue.

2020

Tsai announced on 19 February 2019 via an interview with CNN that she would run for reelection as president in 2020. She registered to run in the Democratic Progressive Party presidential primary on 21 March 2019. Tsai defeated William Lai in the primary, and the Democratic Progressive Party nominated her as its candidate for the 2020 presidential election on 19 June 2019. Tsai and Lai formed the Democratic Progressive Party ticket on 17 November 2019.

Political positions

United States

Tsai supports strong and stable relationships between Taiwan (ROC) and the United States.  In early December 2016, Tsai held an unprecedented telephone call with President-elect Donald Trump. This was the first time that the President of ROC spoke with the president or president-elect of the United States since 1979. Afterwards, she indicated there had been no major "policy shift".

In January 2021, Tsai met with United States Ambassador to the UN Kelly Craft by video link. Craft said: "We discussed the many ways Taiwan is a model for the world, as demonstrated by its success in fighting Covid-19 and all that Taiwan has to offer in the fields of health, technology and cutting-edge science.... the U.S. stands with Taiwan and always will." Speaking in Beijing,  Chinese Ministry of Foreign Affairs spokesman Zhao Lijian said: "Certain U.S. politicians will pay a heavy price for their wrong words and deeds." On her last day in office later that month, Craft called Taiwan "a force for good on the global stage -- a vibrant democracy, a generous humanitarian actor, a responsible actor in the global health community, and a vigorous promoter and defender of human rights."

Cross-strait relations

The DPP's traditional position on the issue of cross-strait relations is that the Republic of China, widely known as Taiwan, is already an independent state governing the territories of Kinmen, Matsu, Penghu Islands, and the island of Taiwan, thus rendering a formal declaration of independence unnecessary. While Tsai has never departed fundamentally from the party line, her personal approach to the issue is nuanced and evolving.

During the 2012 presidential election cycle, Tsai said that she disagreed with the 1992 Consensus as the basis for negotiations between Taiwan and mainland China, that such a consensus only served to buttress the "One China Principle", and that "no such consensus exists" because the majority of the Taiwanese public does not necessarily agree with this consensus. She believed that broad consultations should be held at all levels of Taiwanese society to decide the basis on which to advance negotiations with Beijing, dubbed the "Taiwan consensus". During the 2016 election cycle, Tsai was notably more moderate, making "maintaining the status quo" the centerpiece of party policy. She vowed to work within the Republic of China governing framework in addition to preserving the progress made in cross-strait relations by previous governments, while preserving "freedom and democracy" for the residents of Taiwan.

Tsai believes in the importance of economic and trade links with mainland China, but publicly spoke out against the Economic Cooperation Framework Agreement (ECFA), a preferential trade agreement that increased economic links between Taiwan and mainland China. She generally supports the diversification of Taiwan's economic partners.

In response to the death of Chinese Nobel Peace Prize laureate Liu Xiaobo, who died of organ failure while in government custody, Tsai pleaded with the Communist government to "show confidence in engaging in political reform so that the Chinese can enjoy the God-given rights of freedom and democracy".

Tsai has accused the Communist Party of China's troll army of spreading fake news via social media to influence voters and support candidates more sympathetic to Beijing ahead of the 2018 Taiwanese local elections.

In January 2019, Xi Jinping, General Secretary of the Chinese Communist Party (CCP), had announced an open letter to Taiwan proposing a one country, two systems formula for eventual unification. Tsai responded to Xi in a January 2019 speech by stating that Taiwan rejects "one country, two systems" and that because Beijing equates the 1992 Consensus with "one country, two systems", Taiwan rejects the 1992 Consensus as well.

Tsai expressed her solidarity with Hong Kong protesters, remarking that Taiwan's democracy was hard-earned and had to be guarded and renewed. Pledging that as long as she was Taiwan's president, she would never accept "one country, two systems", Tsai cited what she considered to be the constant and rapid deterioration of Hong Kong's democracy over the course of 20 years.

Domestic policy
Tsai has traditionally been supportive of disadvantaged groups in society, including the poor, women and children, Taiwanese indigenous peoples, and LGBT groups. She favours government action to reduce unemployment, introducing incentives for entrepreneurship among youth, expanding public housing, and government-mandated childcare support. She supports government transparency and more prudent and disciplined fiscal management.

Tsai advocated for the non-partisanship of the president of the Legislative Yuan, the increase in the number of "at-large" seats in the legislature, the broadening of participation among all political parties and interest groups. She supports proactively repairing the damage done to Taiwanese aboriginal groups, as well as the government actions in the February 28 Incident and during the phase of White Terror. She has also called for the de-polarization of Taiwanese politics, and advocates for a more open and consensus-based approach to addressing issues and passing legislation.

LGBT rights
Tsai supports LGBT rights and has endorsed same-sex marriage to be legalised in Taiwan. On 21 August 2015, the day of the annual Qixi Festival, she released a campaign video in which three same-sex couples actors appeared. On 31 October 2015, when the biggest gay pride parade in Asia was held in Taipei, Tsai expressed her support for same-sex marriage. She posted a 15-second video on her Facebook page saying "I am Tsai Ing-wen, and I support marriage equality" and "Let everyone be able to freely love and pursue happiness". However during the presidency, Tsai delayed the process to legalize same-sex marriage due to opposition from conservative and religious groups. After the 2018 Taiwanese referendum, Tsai led the government to legalize same-sex marriage outside of the Civil Code.

Presidency 

In the inauguration speech for her first term, Tsai stated policy goals such as pension reform, long-term care for the elderly, transitional justice, and judicial reform.  She outlined an economic policy of diversification via the New Southbound Policy as well as prioritization of innovative industries.   In terms of cross-strait policy, she acknowledged the 1992 Consensus without agreeing to it and called for continued cross-strait dialogue.

In her second inauguration speech, Tsai outlined her major goals in her second term, including instituting a lay judge system, lowering the voting age from 20 to 18, and establishing a human rights commission under the Control Yuan.  She also outlined her economic policy, which included transitioning from manufacturing to high-tech industries, with a focus on existing semiconductor and information and communications technology industries, cybersecurity, biotechnology and healthcare, domestic production of military equipment, green energy and strategically-critical industries.  She proposed goals for defense reform, including a focus on asymmetric warfare, maintenance of a military reserve force, and reform in management to reflect a democratic society.  On cross-strait issues, she explicitly rejected the one country, two systems model proposed by Beijing and expressed a desire for both sides to coexist peacefully.

Defense policy and indigenous programs 

Under the Tsai administration, military spending has risen in Taiwan relative to GDP.  The defense budget was set to $327 billion NTD in 2018 and $346 billion in 2019. The defense budget in 2020 was set to $411 billion NTD, estimated to be 2.3% of GDP, representing an 8.3% increase in total spending over the previous year and a 0.2% increase in percentage of GDP.  In 2021 it was set to $453 billion NTD, estimated to be 2.4% of GDP, and a 4.4% increase over the previous year.

The administration has also focused on defensive self-sufficiency and developing indigenous industries, such as in submarines and missiles.  The AIDC T-5 Brave Eagle indigenous jet trainer, which started development in 2017, successfully conducted its first test flight in 2020. On 29 June 2020, Tsai announced measures to shore up Taiwan's military reserves, including assigning them the same combat gear as active servicemembers and synchronization of mobilization.  The first domestically-produced rapid mine-laying ship was delivered on 4 August 2020, and construction on an indigenous diesel submarine began in November 2020. The navy's first indigenous amphibious transport dock  was launched on April 13, 2021; named Yu Shan after the mountain with the same name and built by CSBC, it will replace the aging ROCN Hsu Hai (formerly the USS Pensacola).

On 11 March 2022, a special force soldier wrote to Tsai, reporting that insufficient basic logistic supply compelled combatants to purchase equipment from outsider suppliers at their own expense for two years, then being disqualified as non-standard upon inspection, in contrast of the reserve trainees receiving new sets; and appealed to abolish the mandatory diary writing for examination. The classified "2022006470" document was somehow illegally leaked from the presidential palace to the media with his identity exposed on 18 March, then Minister of National Defense, Chiu Kuo-cheng reacted: "I will not let him get away with it", "Fix the crying baby!"; but later clarified after being questioned by the parliament members in the Legislative Yuan, that he just disgusts the coward behavior behind his back, and the critique unfair to the preparatory staff. The case raised the society concern on the standard operating procedure practice on the data security breach to the presidential office.

Diplomatic relations 
Under Tsai, several countries which had formally recognized the Republic of China (ROC) switched recognition to the People's Republic of China (PRC): São Tomé and Príncipe in 2016, Panama in 2017, the Dominican Republic, Burkina Faso and El Salvador in 2018, and the Solomon Islands and Kiribati in 2019, and Nicaragua in 2021. This continued a trend that was temporarily halted under an unofficial "diplomatic truce" during the Ma Ying-jeou administration where the PRC ceased to court official diplomatic allies of the ROC.

At the same time, the Tsai administration saw breakthroughs in Taiwan's unofficial relations with the United States.  On 9 August 2020, the United States Health and Human Services Secretary Alex Azar of the Trump administration became the highest-level Cabinet member to visit Taiwan since the diplomatic break between the ROC and the United States in 1979.  In April 2021, the United States ambassador to Palau made an official visit to Taiwan, the first time a US ambassador had done so since the US switched recognition from the ROC to the PRC in 1979.  In the same month, the United States President Joe Biden also sent an official delegation including former senator Chris Dodd to Taiwan.

On November 3, 2021 the first official European Union delegation arrived in Taiwan led by French MEP Raphael Glucksmann, and consisting of Lithuanian MEPs Andrius Kubilius and Petras Auštrevičius, Czech MEP Markéta Gregorová, Austrian MEP Andreas Schieder, Greek MEP Georgios Kyrtsos and Italian MEP Marco Dreosto.  The visit followed an official tour of Central Europe by foreign minister Joseph Wu which included an unofficial visit to Brussels.

Cross-strait policy 

During her first inauguration speech, Tsai acknowledged that the talks surrounding the 1992 Summit took place but does not agree that a "consensus" was ever reached by both sides. She credited the talks with spurring 20 years of dialogue and exchange between the two sides. She hoped that exchanges would continue on the basis of these historical facts, as well as the existence of the Republic of China constitutional system and democratic will of the Taiwanese people. In response, Beijing called Tsai's answer an "incomplete test paper" because Tsai did not agree to the content of the 1992 Consensus. On 25 June 2016, Beijing suspended official cross-strait communications, with any remaining cross-strait exchanges thereafter taking place through unofficial channels.

In January 2019, Xi Jinping, the General Secretary of the Chinese Communist Party (CCP), wrote an open letter to Taiwan, proposing a one country, two systems formula for eventual unification. Tsai responded to Xi in a January 2019 speech by stating that Taiwan rejects "one country, two systems" and that because Beijing equates the 1992 Consensus with "one country, two systems", Taiwan rejects the 1992 Consensus as well. During her second inauguration speech, Tsai rejected one country, two systems explicitly again and reaffirmed her previous stance that cross-strait exchanges should be held on the basis of parity between the two sides. She further remarked that cross-strait relations had reached a "historical turning point."

On October 10, 2021 During her speech on the Double Tenth Day, President Tsai solemnly rejected the idea of "complete unification of Chinese motherland" through a peaceful unification under "One country, two systems" proposed by the Chinese leader Xi Jinping on the 72nd Anniversary of the founding of the People's Republic of China. She insisted "the two sides (The ROC and PRC) of the Taiwan Strait do not belong to each other" (海峽兩岸互不隸屬).

Energy policy 

The Tsai administration has stated an electricity supply goal of 20% from renewables, 30% from coal and 50% from liquefied natural gas by 2025.

Green energy 

Bills under the umbrella of the Forward-Looking Infrastructure initiative have been used to fund green energy initiatives.  The administration plans to install 1,000 wind turbines on land and offshore and has contracted Ørsted of Denmark to install 900 MW of capacity and wpd of Germany to install 1 GW of capacity. Taiwan's first offshore wind farm, Formosa I, consisting of 22 wind turbines expected to produce 128 MW, is slated to begin operations at the end of 2019.  The government also purchased 520 MW of solar capacity in 2017 and more than 1 GW in 2018; total capacity was 2.8 GW at the end of 2018, with the government planning to deploy an addition 1.5 GW of solar power in 2019 and 2.2 GW in 2020.

Break-up of Taipower 

The government approved amendments to the Electricity Act on 20 October 2016 to break up the state-owned monopoly Taipower into subsidiaries and further liberalize the power sector by allowing companies to sell electricity to users directly rather than selling through Taipower.  In particular, the generation and distribution divisions of Taipower are to be separated.  Amongst the stated motivations for liberalisation was to allow for the direct purchase of green energy by consumers. The plan also included emissions controls, the creation of a regulatory agency, mandatory reserve margins (waived for start-up green energy companies), and measures for price stabilization. The plan was met with protests by Taipower employees.

Nuclear energy 

Tsai campaigned on a promise to make Taiwan nuclear-free by 2025, which was codified into law on 11 January 2017 via amendments to the Electricity Act.  An energy blackout due to an unrelated operational mistake have led some to question the nuclear phase-out.  According to the results of the 2018 referendum, this provision was abolished on 7 May 2019.  Nonetheless, the administration has maintained a goal of phasing out nuclear energy. The controversial nuclear waste site on Orchid Island and the dangers of nuclear power plants in a seismic activity area (Taiwan is in a region of the world very prone to large earthquakes and tsunamis) like what happened at Fukushima in Japan in 2011 influenced Tsai and her party to make Taiwan nuclear power-free by 2025. While the nuclear energy referendum guaranteed that nuclear energy would not be abolished in 2018 Tsai decided to not renew the three remaining nuclear power plants' licenses which would expire after 40 years. Of the three active nuclear power plants as of 2016, the Jinshan Nuclear Power Plant was shut down in July 2019, the Kuosheng Nuclear Power Plant will be decommissioned in March 2023, and the final nuclear power plant to shut down will be the Maanshan Nuclear Power Plant in May 2025.

Forward-looking infrastructure 

On 5 July 2017, the first Forward-Looking Infrastructure Bill passed the Legislative Yuan.  The bill provided $420 billion NTD in funds over a period of 4 years toward infrastructure projects in light-rail infrastructure, water supply infrastructure, flood control measures, and green energy, talent development, urban and rural infrastructure, digital infrastructure and food safety.  Other projects include improving road safety and aesthetics, locally oriented industrial parks, recreation centers, bicycle paths, and public service centers for long-term care.

Judicial reform 

The Tsai administration proposed a lay judge system modelled after Japan's over a jury system proposed by the New Power Party.  The Citizen Judges Act was passed on 22 July 2020, instituting a lay judge system with three professional judges along six lay judges.  The law is set to take effect in 2023.

Labour reform 

On 1 January 2017, the amended Labour Standards Law (commonly referred to as 一例一休 ), which was passed on 6 December 2016 by the legislature, took effect.  The amendments stipulated, with some exceptions, a 40-hour five-day work week with one compulsory rest day and one flexible rest day.  On the flexible rest day, workers may work for overtime pay, and the compulsory rest day guaranteed that workers could not work more than six days in a row.  The amendments also reduced the number of national holidays from 19 to 12, eliminating Youth Day, Teachers’ Day, Retrocession Day, Chiang Kai-shek's birthday, Sun Yat-sen's birthday, Constitution Day and the day following New Year's Day.  Prior to the amendments, the Labor Standards Act stipulated a maximum of 84 hours of work in any given 14 day period.  The amendments were met with protests from labor groups, who opposed the reduction of national holidays and demanded that work on flexible rest days should result in compensatory vacation days in addition to overtime pay.

After taking effect, the amendments were criticized for their lack of flexibility, resulting in a net decrease in total pay and an increase in cost of living, and for having an overly complicated scheme for calculating overtime pay, leading the administration to further revise the Labor Standards Act.  On 1 March 2018, the second revision of the Labor Standards Act came into effect.  The revisions relaxed the previous regulations by stipulating two compulsory rest days for each 14 day period rather than one compulsory rest day for each 7 day period, meaning that workers could work for 12 days in a row.  The revisions also simplified the formula for overtime pay.  The revisions were met with protests and hunger strikes by labor groups.

National languages 

The Tsai administration took actions to preserve languages facing a crisis of inheritance and to put them on more equal footing to Mandarin.  Previously, the only national language was Mandarin; during her administration, the national languages of Taiwan were eventually broadened to include Mandarin, Taiwanese Hokkien, Hakka, 16 indigenous Formosan languages, Taiwanese Sign Language and the Matsu dialect of Eastern Min spoken on the Matsu Islands.

The Indigenous Languages Development Act took effect on 14 June 2017, designating 16 indigenous Formosan languages as national languages.  Hakka was made a national language via amendments to the Hakka Basic Act on 29 December 2017.  On 25 December 2018, the sweeping National Languages Development Act passed the legislature, creating broadcast services for each national language of Taiwan, providing interpreters for all national languages in the legislature, guaranteeing access to public services in each language (including legislative, and introducing elective language classes in primary schools.  The act also directed the government to work with civic groups to create standard orthographies for each national language, and to develop a plan for preserving and revitalizing threatened languages.  It furthermore automatically designated, in Article 3, all languages of all ethnic groups in Taiwan as national languages, thus clearing the way for Taiwanese Hokkien, Taiwanese Sign Language, and the Matsu dialect to become national languages.

On 15 August 2019, the government amended the Enforcement Rules of the Passport Act to allow for the use of romanizations of names in any national language (Hakka, Hoklo or indigenous languages) in passports.

On 27 September 2021, Legislator Chen Po-wei of the Taiwan Statebuilding Party spoke Taiwanese during a session questioning the Foreign and National Defense Committee. The Minister of National Defense Chiu Kuo-cheng responded by asking Chen to speak Mandarin to allow for easier communication, and would not lengthen the session to accommodate the interpretive service, after which the exchange became heated.  Chen later apologized on Facebook, saying that the language barrier led to contextual errors.  The parliamentary interpretation service stipulated by the National Languages Development Act were temporarily suspended pending improvements.

New Southbound Policy 

The New Southbound Policy was launched on 5 September 2016 with the intent to make Taiwan less dependent on Mainland China and to improve Taiwan's cooperation with other countries.  The 18 countries the New Southbound Policy targeted for increased cooperation are: Thailand, Indonesia, Philippines, Malaysia, Singapore, Brunei, Vietnam, Myanmar, Cambodia, Laos, India, Pakistan, Bangladesh, Nepal, Sri Lanka, Bhutan, Australia and New Zealand.  The policy designated areas of cooperation in trade, technology, agriculture, medicine, education, and tourism.  In mid-2019, the Taiwanese government announced that since the implementation of the policy, bilateral trade between Taiwan and the targeted countries increased by 22%, while investment by targeted countries increased by 60%.  Further, the number of medical patients from targeted countries increased by 50%, the number of visitors increased by 58%, and the number of students increased by 52%.  During the COVID-19 pandemic, Taiwan donated 1 million masks to countries targeted in the New Southbound Policy.

Pension reform 

International observers have noted that Taiwan's pre-reform pension system was due to default by 2030 for civil servants and 2020 for the military.  Pension reform was passed via two separate bills, one dealing with civil servants and schoolteachers on 27 June 2017 and another dealing with military veterans on 20 June 2018.  On 1 July 2018, the pension reforms came into effect.  Civil servants, upon retirement, have a choice between receiving pensions in monthly instalments subject to a preferential interest rate or via a lump sum.  Under the reforms, the previous preferential interest rate for those who opted for monthly instalments would be gradually reduced from 18% to 0% over the span of 30 months.  Civil servants who opted for a lump sum would see their interest rates decreased from 18% to 6% over a period of 6 years.  The reforms were estimated to affect 63,000 military veterans, 130,000 public servants and 140,000 schoolteachers.  The reforms simultaneously set minimum monthly pensions for schoolteachers and civil servants at $32,160 NTD and for military veterans at $38,990 NTD.  The reforms also raised the minimum retirement age to 60 from 55, to increase by 1 per year until the retirement age reaches 65. Though the reforms were met with protests from government retirees and veterans, polls have shown that the majority of Taiwanese are satisfied with the outcome of the pension reforms.  After a legal challenge by the KMT, the Constitutional Court found most of the pension reform constitutional, while striking down clauses regarding the suspension of pensions for retirees that took jobs later in the private sector.

Same-sex marriage 

On 24 May 2017, the Constitutional Court ruled that the constitutional right to equality and freedom of marriage guarantees same-sex couples the right to marry under the Constitution of the Republic of China. The ruling (Judicial Yuan Interpretation No. 748) gave the Legislative Yuan two years to bring the marriage laws into compliance, after which registration of such marriages would come into force automatically. Following the ruling, progress on implementing a same-sex marriage law was slow due to government inaction and strong opposition from some conservative people and Christian groups. In November 2018, the Taiwanese electorate passed referendums to prevent recognition of same-sex marriages in the Civil Code and to restrict teaching about LGBT issues. The Government responded by confirming that the Court's ruling would be implemented and that the referendums could not support laws contrary to the Constitution.

On 20 February 2019, a draft bill entitled the Act for Implementation of J.Y. Interpretation No. 748 was released. The draft bill would grant same-sex married couples almost all the rights available to heterosexual married couples under the Civil Code, with the exception that it only allows adoption of a child genetically related to one of them.  The Executive Yuan passed it the following day, sending it to the Legislative Yuan for fast-tracked review. The bill was passed on 17 May, signed by the President on 22 May and took effect on 24 May 2019 (the last day possible under the Court's ruling).

Transitional justice and ill-gotten assets 

 
The Act on Promoting Transitional Justice was passed by the Legislative Yuan on 5 December 2017. The act sought to rectify injustices committed by the authoritarian Kuomintang government of the Republic of China on Taiwan, and to this end established the Transitional Justice Commission to investigate actions taken from 15 August 1945, the date of the Hirohito surrender broadcast, to 6 November 1992, when president Lee Teng-hui lifted the Temporary Provisions against the Communist Rebellion for Fujian Province, Republic of China, ending the period of mobilization.  This time period, in particular, includes the February 28 Incident as well as White Terror.  The committee's main aims include: making political archives more readily available, removing authoritarian symbols, redressing judicial injustice, and producing a report on the history of the period which delineates steps to further promote transitional justice.  Thus far, the commission has exonerated political criminals from the martial law era, made recommendations on the removal of authoritarian symbols, and declassified government documents from the martial law era.

The Act Governing the Handling of Ill-gotten Properties by Political Parties and Their Affiliate Organizations was passed in July and Wellington Koo, one of the main authors of the Act, was named as the committee chairman in August.  The stated goal of the act is to investigate state assets which were illegally transferred to private political parties and affiliates during the martial law era, and therefore applies only to political parties officially formed before the end of martial law.  This effectively limits its scope to the KMT, which has insisted that it has been illegally and unconstitutionally persecuted and that the investigation is a political witch hunt. However, the ruling Democratic Progressive Party (DPP) maintained that the means are necessary for achieving transitional justice and leveling the playing field for all political parties. Thus far, the committee has determined that the China Youth Corps, Central Motion Picture Corp., National Women's League, and the Broadcasting Corporation of China were KMT-affiliated organizations and either froze their assets or ordered them to forfeit them.  The KMT had difficulty paying salaries as its assets were frozen during the investigation.

The KMT challenged the constitutionality of the Ill-gotten Properties Act, asserting that the law deprived the right of citizens to form political parties by depriving those parties of assets needed for their operation.  In August 2020, the Constitutional Court ruled that the law was constitutional.  In its interpretation, Judicial Yuan secretary-general Lin Hui-Huang wrote that the law was a form of transitional justice and viewed it as a corrective measure for actions during the martial law period which were legal in form but contrary to the principles of constitutional democracy.

Personal life and family
Tsai's paternal grandfather came from a prominent Hakka family in Fangshan, Pingtung. Her grandmother, from Shizi, Pingtung, was of aboriginal Paiwan descent. Tsai's father, Tsai Chieh-sheng owned a car repair business. Tsai's mother is Chang Chin-fong, the last of her father's four mistresses. Tsai is the youngest of her parents' four children. She also has seven elder half-siblings on her father's side and a half-brother on her mother's side. She is the first Taiwanese president of aboriginal descent, and the second of Hakka descent after Lee Teng-hui.

Tsai is unmarried and has no children, making her Taiwan’s first unmarried president. However, her father believed the former to have too many strokes for the girl to learn, so she was instead named , which can be literally translated by its individual parts as "heroic" and "literature". The word 英文 is coincidentally also the Chinese name for the English language, as yīng is also used as a phonetic approximation of the first syllable of "England". Tsai also has an Paiwan name, Tjuku.

Pets
Tsai is known to be a cat lover, and her two cats, "Think Think" and "Ah Tsai", featured prominently in her election campaign. In October 2016, she adopted three retired guide dogs, named Bella, Bunny, and Maru.

Honors
She has received:
:
 Order of Belize (2018)
:
 Grand Cross with Gold Star of the National Order of Doctor José Matías Delgado (2017)
:
 Collar of the Order of the Elephant (2018)
:
 Grand Collar of the Order of the Quetzal (2017)
Peace Ambassador
:
 Grand Cross of the National Order of Honour and Merit (2018)
:
 Grand Cross with Gold Star of the Order of Francisco Morazán (2016)
:
 Grand Collar of the National Order of Merit (2016)
 
  Order of St Christopher and Nevis (2019)

Notes

References

Further reading

External links

 

|-

|-

|-

|-

|-

|-

|-

1956 births
Living people
Politicians of the Republic of China on Taiwan from Taipei
Politicians of the Republic of China on Taiwan from Pingtung County
Presidents of the Republic of China on Taiwan
Democratic Progressive Party chairpersons
Democratic Progressive Party Members of the Legislative Yuan
Democratic Progressive Party presidential nominees
Female heads of government
Members of the 6th Legislative Yuan
Party List Members of the Legislative Yuan
Taiwanese politicians of Hakka descent
Women presidents
Taiwanese legal scholars
Taiwanese politicians of indigenous descent
Taiwanese LGBT rights activists
Asian social liberals
National Taiwan University alumni
Alumni of the University of London
Alumni of the London School of Economics
Cornell Law School alumni
Cornell University alumni
Academic staff of the National Chengchi University
Academic staff of Soochow University (Taiwan)
Grand Crosses of the Order of José Matías Delgado
Grand Crosses of the Order of the Quetzal
20th-century Taiwanese women politicians
21st-century Taiwanese women politicians
Women government ministers of Taiwan